The 2001 St. Louis mayoral election was held on April 3, 2001 to elect the mayor of St. Louis, Missouri. It saw the election of Francis Slay and the defeat of incumbent mayor Clarence Harmon in the Democratic primary.

The election was preceded by party primaries on March 6.

Democratic primary

General election

References

Mayoral elections in St. Louis
St. Louis
2000s in St. Louis
St. Louis